Jessica Jeane King (born July 21, 1975) is an American lawyer and politician from Wisconsin. She is a former Democratic member of the Wisconsin Senate, representing the 18th district when elected in 2011. She defeated incumbent Republican Senator Randy Hopper in a special recall election on August 9, 2011, and took office August 25, 2011; but lost the seat the following year to another Republican, Rick Gudex, in the November 2012 general election, which reverted that chamber back to Republican control.

Background
King was born and raised in Fond du Lac County, Wisconsin. Her parents were disabled,  and she became a ward of the state at age 15.

She put herself through the University of Wisconsin, Oshkosh, working in a juicebox factory and doing similar work, and went on to earn a J.D. degree from Thomas Jefferson School of Law in California.

In 2004, she returned to Wisconsin to care for her aging parents. She opened a small business, and served as an adjunct professor at University of Wisconsin-Oshkosh.

She is a former associate attorney who was with Steinhilber, Swanson, Mares, Marone & McDermott.

King was elected to the Oshkosh Common Council, eventually becoming deputy mayor, In 2008, she ran against Hopper for the Senate losing by only 163 votes  (41,741 to 41,904).

Wisconsin Senate
In the wake of the 2011 Wisconsin protests, King was one of two Wisconsin Democratic challengers successful in unseating Republican incumbent senators who had supported Governor Walker. The 18th district includes Fond du Lac, Oshkosh, and Waupun. She narrowly defeated Hopper by 1254 votes (28,191 votes to 26,937).

On November 13, 2012, King conceded to Republican Rick Gudex, then Fond du Lac City Council president. As a result of the race, the Wisconsin State Senate reverted to Republican control by a two-vote majority in January 2013.

2020 congressional election
She ran against incumbent Glenn Grothman for Wisconsin's 6th congressional district in 2020. She received 164,239 votes, or 40.72% of the total votes cast, losing the election.

References

External links

Jessica King for Wisconsin campaign website
Senate profile (archived)

1975 births
21st-century American women politicians
Living people
People from Fond du Lac County, Wisconsin
Thomas Jefferson School of Law people
University of Wisconsin–Oshkosh alumni
University of Wisconsin–Oshkosh faculty
Wisconsin city council members
Democratic Party Wisconsin state senators
Women state legislators in Wisconsin
Women city councillors in Wisconsin
American women academics
21st-century American politicians